In 1562, Holy Roman Emperor Ferdinand I and the Ottoman Sultan Suleiman I formalized a truce made in 1547 between Holy Roman and Ottoman Empires.

The treaty confirmed that the Ottoman Empire kept its gains in central Hungary, while the western and northern Hungary remained under Hapsburg rule. The treaty confirmed that Transylvania remained under Ottoman control.

See also 
 List of treaties

References

Sources

1562 in Asia
1562 in Europe
1562 in law
Constantinople
Constantinople 1562
Constantinople 1562
16th century in Istanbul
1562 in the Ottoman Empire